Jothegara is a 2010 Indian Kannada romance film written and directed by Sigamani and produced by Ashwini Ram Prasad. The film features Prem Kumar and Ramya in the lead roles.

The film was widely popular for its title song composed by Sujeeth Shetty upon release; however, the film failed to impress the critics.

Cast 
 Prem Kumar as Vishwas
 Ramya as Priya
 Lakshmi 
 Doddanna 
 Ashish Vidyarthi as ACP Veerabhadra
 Sadhu Kokila
 Sudha Belawadi
 Prathap
 Padmaja Rao
 Layendra
 Jennifer Kotwal as an item number

Soundtrack 
The music of the film was composed by Sujeeth Shetty. The title song was received extremely well and became very popular.

Reception 

Shruti Indira Lakshminarayana of Rediff.com scored the film at 1.5 out of 5 stars and says "Camera work by Raghav is particularly good in songs. Having said that there is nothing great about the introductory song over which the hero and the producer had clashed. You find yourself asking what the fuss was all about? Jotegaara is a predictable love story and given the delays it has encountered in its release, you are left to wonder if the wait was really worth it? ". A critic from The New Indian Express wrote "Prem looks convincing in his role. Ramya looks glamorous in the song sequences but there is little scope for her to showcase her acting skills. Veteran actor Ashish Vidyarthi comes out with a good performance as a police officer. Lakshmi impresses in her brief role. Rajendra Karanth and Petrol Prasanna look menacing in their negative roles". A critic from The Times of India scored the film at 3.5 out of 5 stars and wrote  "Prem is good and emotes well. Ramya carries the story forward with her brilliant performance. Lakshmi and Ashish Vidyarthi are gracious. While cinematography by N Raghav is eye-catching, music by Sangeeth Shetty is okay". A critic from Bangalore Mirror wrote  "Though the storyline is old, tried and tested, the director has, one should say, taught the old dog some new tricks. However, the narration is marred by some ugly use of scissors on the editing table, which has scarred the final output a wee bit. Cinematography by N Raghav's (from across the border) has an appealing cadence, complemented by melodious music by Suchit Shetty. Watch out for the title song Jotheyagi nee baro jothegara...it is a charbuster".

References

External links 

 Jothegara Movie Review

2010 films
2010s Kannada-language films
Indian romance films
2010 romance films